Tamara Mkheidze (December 22, 1915 in Kutaisi – 
April 11, 2007 in Tbilisi) was a Georgian arachnologist.

Life 

Tamara Mkheidze grew up in Kutaisi (Georgia) and later studied zoology at the Tbilisi State University. She worked there as a lecturer until 1990 and was active after that as an arachnologist.

She was married to the limnologist Lavrosi Kutubidze.

Activities 

Tamara Mkheidze was the first arachnologist from the Caucasus region. Her main research dealt with the arachnofauna of her homeland Georgia. In her more than thirty publications she described more than forty new species of spiders and harvestmen.

Publications 

Mkheidze T. S. (1941). A study on spiders distributed in Georgia. - Proceeding of the Tbilisi State University, 21: 99-104. [in Georgian]

Mkheidze, T. S. (1946). New spider species in Georgia. Bulletin of the Georgian State Museum Tbilisi, 13(A): 285-302.

Mkheidze, Tamara (1997): Georgian Spiders — Systematics, Ecology, Zoogeographic Review. Tbilisi University Press. Tbilisi, 390 pp. [Georgian, Russian Abstract]

References

External links 

 A German obituary at www.caucasus-spiders.info.

1915 births
2007 deaths
Soviet arachnologists
Scientists from Georgia (country)
Women zoologists
20th-century zoologists
20th-century women scientists